Olivia Reynolds is a fictional character in the DC Comics universe. She has a latent superpower (the U-Mind), and has been abducted by various races who wanted to harness the power, and temporarily became a villainess. All memories of her experiences with the U-Mind have now been blocked after she was mindwiped.

She is bisexual and has been romantically linked to both Green Lantern and Icemaiden.

Fictional character biography
A toy saleswoman and rival of Hal Jordan's, Olivia later became his girlfriend. For a long time, she was unaware of her latent power, her U-Mind that sustained an entire race (the Lenglyns of Lengyl). When the alien Mogrians sought to retrieve the U-mind, Hal (as Green Lantern) and Flash battled them to save Olivia as well as the Lenglyns.

The Weaponers of Qward later kidnapped her, seeking to use her U-Mind to tap into a power called the Ergono and open the obelisk, a monument left behind by the ancient Qward. Hal and Dr. Eli Bently (Olivia's physician) saved her, but not before the obelisk was shattered.

Years later, Olivia returned into Hal's life as a representative for the new Green Lantern toyline and they renewed their romance. During this time, the Lenglyns and the Weaponers of Qward attempted to control the Ergono power by abducting Olivia and Aleea Strange (daughter of Adam Strange) (whom they realized had the U-Mind power). A band of Qward soldiers captured Olivia again, hoping that her presence would help them oppose the Weaponers. This time, the power of the Ergono usurped her. Driven mad with power, she sought to become queen of Qward.

Green Lantern came into direct contact with Ergono and was subsequently captured by Olivia, who has been possessed by it. While subdued, he comes to the following realization: "The first time I was blasted by Ergono I was hammered by an awareness of my own mortality. It shook me. It nearly finished me. I rallied back on pure emotion -- but after the incident was over I never felt quite the same. Just a few days later I had that confrontation in Star City with Green Arrow. I stopped a young ghetto dweller from attacking a slumlord -- and Arrow ridiculed me, accused me of playing super-cop to feed my ego. Normally, I'd've told him to let me do my job. But instead -- it shook me to the core of my being. For years after that my will was shaky. I lacerated myself with doubt and indecision. Dear Lord. Were all those years of confusion caused by that one blast of Ergono?"  This later raised the question about whether his exposure to Ergono caused his eventual transformation into Parallax.

Hal and Adam Strange rescued Olivia from the Ergono's control, and then Hal wiped clean Olivia's memories of her U-Mind and any events on Qward.

Slowly, the relationship between Olivia and Hal faded away until being abruptly ended by Hal's insanity and becoming Parallax. Green Lantern, (vol. 3) #47's conclusion seemed to indicate another plot by Olivia, yet this would never be because DC Comics decided to go another direction (Emerald Twilight) and ignored this hint.

Still later, Olivia became her toy company's liaison with Guy Gardner and the Justice League, responsible for developing Guy Gardner: Warrior and Justice League America toylines. During this time, she had a flirtation with Icemaiden. It is unknown if their relationship developed further.

Powers
Known as the "U-Mind", Reynold's mind sustained an entire alien race, the Lenglyns of Lengyl. The U-Mind is used to control the Ergono power (a power similar to the Anti-Life Equation sought by Darkseid). It has been theorized the Ergono power and the Anti-Life Equation may be one and the same, and Olivia could be the human that Darkseid needs to abduct in order to tap into the power.

Both the Lenglyns and the Weaponers of Qward have battled over the power, but it is believed only Reynolds and Aleea Strange (daughter of Adam Strange) have access to it.

See also
 Anti-Life Equation

References

External links
Olivia Reynolds at the JLA Appendix
The Many Loves of Hal Jordan
Olivia Reynolds - Green Lantern Review Website Profile
Understanding the History of Qward
Unofficial Olivia Reynolds Biography

DC Comics LGBT supervillains
Fictional bisexual females
Fictional female businesspeople